Jacques Daléchamps (1513, Caen – 1588) was a French botanist and physician. When the scholar Isaac Casaubon first established the Greek text of the recently rediscovered Deipnosophistae, it was printed alongside a Latin translation by Daléchamps.

He was the pupil of Guillaume Rondelet and became physician of the Hôtel-Dieu de Lyon.

In 1552, he published Raymond Chalin de Vinario's “treatise on the plague”.

Works
 Histoire generale des plantes Bd.1-2 . Lyon 1615 Digital edition by the University and State Library Düsseldorf

Further reading

References

1513 births
1588 deaths
Physicians from Caen
16th-century  French botanists
16th-century French physicians
Scientists from Caen